Jean-François Deniau (31 October 1928 – 24 January 2007) was a French politician, diplomat, essayist and novelist. Until 1998, he was a member of the Union for French Democracy (UDF).

Biography

Minister and diplomat
In 1958, he became the director of Foreign Relations for the European Commission.  He was the author of the foreword of the Treaty of Rome. In 1963, he was named French ambassador to Mauritania and in 1967 he was appointed as one of the French European Commissioners, as a member of the Rey Commission, in 1970 followed by his membership of the Malfatti Commission.  He was responsible for the accession negotiations of Great Britain, the Republic of Ireland, Denmark and Norway, and for assistance to developing countries.

In 1973, he entered the government of Pierre Messmer as Secretary of State for Coopération, and was then named Secretary of State to the Ministry of Agriculture and Rural Development in the government formed by Jacques Chirac after the election of Valéry Giscard d'Estaing to the presidency of the French Republic in 1974. In 1976, J.F. Deniau became France's ambassador to Madrid, on the request of the new king Juan Carlos, with whom he had begun a friendship during regattas.  Deniau would play an active advisory role to the king and the government during Spain's democratic transition following the death of general Franco.

In September 1977, Jean-François Deniau was named Secretary of State to the Ministry of Foreign Affairs in the government of Raymond Barre, then Minister of Foreign Commerce (1978), and finally Minister of Administrative Reform in Raymond Barre's last government (1981).

From 1978 to 1981 and from 1986 to 1997 he was a member of the French parliament.

As a writer
He was elected to the Académie Française on 9 April 1992.

He died in Paris in 2007, aged 78.

Bibliography

Le Bord des larmes  (1955)
Le Marché commun  (1958)
La mer est ronde  (1975)
L'Europe interdite  (1977)
Deux heures après minuit  (1985)
La Désirade  (1988)
Un héros très discret  (1989)
L'Empire nocturne  (1990)
Ce que je crois  (1992)
Le Secret du Roi des serpents  (1993)
Mémoires de sept vies. Tome 1 : Les temps aventureux  (1994)
L'Atlantique est mon désert  (1996)
Mémoires de sept vies. Tome 2 : Croire et oser  (1997)
Le Bureau des secrets perdus  (1998)
Tadjoura  (1999)
Histoires de courage  (2000)
La bande à Suzanne  (2000)
L'île Madame  (2001)
Dictionnaire amoureux de la mer  (2002)
La gloire à 20 ans  (2003)
La Double Passion écrire ou agir  (2004)
La Lune et le miroir  (2004)
Le Secret du roi des Serpents  (2005)
Le grand jeu  (2005)

References

External links
 
  

1928 births
2007 deaths
Writers from Paris
Independent Republicans politicians
Republican Party (France) politicians
Union for French Democracy politicians
20th-century French diplomats
20th-century French novelists
21st-century French novelists
Politicians of the French Fifth Republic
Government ministers of France
French Ministers for Administrative Reform
Secretaries of State of France
Ambassadors of France to Mauritania
Ambassadors of France to Spain
Members of the Académie Française
French European Commissioners
Sciences Po alumni
École nationale d'administration alumni
Grand Officiers of the Légion d'honneur
Prix Maurice Genevoix winners
Lycée Pasteur (Neuilly-sur-Seine) alumni
French male essayists
French male novelists
20th-century French essayists
21st-century French essayists
20th-century French male writers
21st-century French male writers
European Commissioners 1967–1970
European Commissioners 1970–1972
European Commissioners 1972–1973
European Commissioners 1973–1977